Runanubandham is a 1960 Indian Telugu-language drama film, produced by P. Adinarayana Rao under the Anjali Pictures banner and directed by Vedantam Raghavayya. It stars Akkineni Nageswara Rao and Anjali Devi, with music composed by P. Adinarayana Rao. This film had its beginning sequence in Gevacolor.

Plot
Lakshmi (Anjali Devi) an orphan lives in a village, and Subbanna (Gummadi) a local goon treats her as his sister. In the same village, Pratap Rao (C.S.R), a zamindar converts his property into gold, due to fear of the land ceiling act and decides to leave the city. Unfortunately, that night, their house catches fire in which Zamindar dies and his wife Kantham (Nirmalamma) & son Raghu (Master Gopi) are rescued by Lakshmi. Before breathes her last, Kantham reveals her ambition to see her son as a doctor when Lakshmi promises her to fulfill her dream. Thereafter, Lakshmi shifts to the city join Raghu in the school, and start working as a servant at school headmaster Narasimham's (Relangi) house. Here Suryam (Akkineni Nageswara Rao) nephew of the headmaster falls for her and he too decides to take part in her responsibility. Meanwhile, Subbanna digs out the hidden treasure from the burnt house, hands over it to Govt, and moves in search of Lakshmi & Raghu. After crossing many hurdles, Subbanna finds the whereabouts of Lakshmi until then Pratap Rao's cousin Veerabhadraiah (Rajanala) seizes the property and the concerned authorities deny Subbanna's words when self-esteem Lakshmi leaves that place. Parallelly, Narasimham's wife Gajalakshmi (Suryakantham) learns about the love affair of Lakshmi & Suryam, so, she ploys, by attributing an illicit relationship between Lakshmi & Subbanna and performs Suryam's marriage with her daughter Padma (Girija). Knowing it, angered Subbanna seeks to kill Gajalakshmi, thereby, lands in jail. Now Lakshmi is left alone but stands up with courage and toils to fulfill her aim. Years roll by, and Lakshmi succeeds in making Raghu (Haranath) a doctor. At present, Raghu wants to construct a hospital to serve the destitute. Then, Lakshmi remembers his father's treasure. On the other side, Veerabhadraiah finds out that Raghu is alive, so, he intrigues to eliminate him. At the same time, Subbanna releases and brings out the truth from Gajalakshmi. Immediately, Suryam rushes for Lakshmi, by that time, Veerabhadraiah kidnaps Lakshmi & Raghu. Suryam & Subbanna rescues them, in which Lakshmi dies while guarding Raghu against harm. Finally, the movie ends with Raghu constructing a memorial hospital in the name of Lakshmi.

Cast
Anjali Devi as Lakshmi
Akkineni Nageswara Rao as Suryam 
Gummadi as Subbanna
Suryakantham as Gajalakshmi
Haranath as Dr. Raghu & Raghu (dual role)
Master Gopi as Young Raghu
Relangi as Narasimham 
Rajanala as Veerabhadraiah 
C.S.R as Zamindar Pratap Rao 
Peketi Sivaram as Seetaiah 
Allu Ramalingaiah as Panthulu  
Girija as Padma 
Nirmalamma as Kantham

Crew
Art: Vaali, Sekhar
Choreography: Vempati
Story — Dialogues: Acharya Aatreya
Lyrics: Samudrala Jr, Kosaraju
Playback: Ghantasala, P. Susheela, S. Janaki, P. B. Sreenivas 
Editing: N. S. Prakasam
Cinematography: C. Nageswara Rao 
Music — Producer: P. Adinarayana Rao
Screenplay — Director: Vedantam Raghavayya
Banner: Anjali Pictures 
Release Date: 7 December 1960

Soundtrack

Music composed by P. Adinarayana Rao. Music released on EMI Columbia Audio Company.

References

Indian drama films